Antoni Protazy Potocki (11 September 1761 – 1801), aka Prot, was a Polish nobleman and an early entrepreneur. He was born to Paula née Szembek and her second husband, Count Jan Prosper Potocki, Starosta of Guzów. He was a younger half-brother of Feliks Lubienski and older half-brother of Michal Kleofas Oginski and his sister, Józefa Ogińska.

Antoni was voivode of Kiev in 1791 and briefly, starost of Guzów. He became a banker in Warsaw.

As proprietor of the Chudniv estate, he established several factories in the village of Makhnivka, near Berdychiv. He was director the Polish Black Sea Trading Company, and ran an import-export business in Russian-ruled Kherson. According to his great nephew, Thomas Wentworth Łubieński, "Prot" turned Odessa from a "sleepy fishing village" into an international trade centre. This subsequently attracted the attention of Catherine the Great who turned the thriving port into one of Russia's leading cities. Potocki had inherited wealth from his father. Due to the economic crisis in the country Potocki was bankrupt in 1793.
He was invested as a Knight of the Order of the White Eagle, awarded on May 8, 1781.

References 

1761 births
1801 deaths
People from Żyrardów County
Polish bankers
Ruthenian nobility of the Polish–Lithuanian Commonwealth
19th-century Polish businesspeople
Antoni Protazy Potocki
18th-century Polish–Lithuanian businesspeople
Privy Councillor (Russian Empire)